Jang In-hwan (March 30, 1875 – April 24, 1930) was a Korean independence activist. He is best known along with Jeon Myeong-un for his role in the 1908 assassination of Durham Stevens, a former diplomat and Japan lobbyist.

Incident
Jang, a Christian, emigrated from Korea to Hawaii in February 1905, and from there to the continental United States in August 1906. He became involved with the Korean independence movement while living there, and joined the Daedong Bogukhoe. In March 1908, infuriated by Stevens' remarks about Japanese rule in Korea, the Daedong Bogukhoe held a joint meeting with the Dongnip Hyeophoe, another local association of Koreans of which Jeon was a member. Yang Ju-eun, a fellow member of the association, recalled in a 1974 interview that Jang, in contrast to Jeon, did not say a single word during that meeting; Jang had a reputation as a "quiet and shy Christian gentleman." However, he purchased a gun from his roommate in order to circumvent laws which prevented Asians from owning guns.

On March 23, 1908, Jeon and Jang approached Stevens at the Port of San Francisco as he prepared to embark on a ferry to Oakland to make a rail connection to Washington, D.C. Jeon fired his revolver at Stevens first, but missed, and instead rushed at him, using his weapon as a club to hit Stevens in the face. Jang then accidentally fired into the melee, striking Stevens twice in the back; Jeon was also shot in the confusion. The crowd which had gathered urged that they be lynched on the spot; Jang was arrested and held without bail on a charge of murder, while Jeon was sent to the hospital for treatment. He received news of Stevens' death two days later with "manifest delight".

Trial
Because there was insufficient evidence to prove that Jeon and Jang had conspired with each other, Jeon was released in June, and Jang ordered to stand trial as the sole defendant. The Korean community hired three lawyers to defend Jang, among whom one, Nathan Coughlan, eventually agreed to take on the case pro bono. During the trial, he planned to use Arthur Schopenhauer's theory of "patriotic insanity" to argue that Jang was not guilty by reason of insanity. Jang's trial was originally scheduled to begin on July 27 in the San Francisco Superior Court. However, on the day of the trial, presiding judge Carroll Cook held a conference in chambers with Coughlan and several members of the Korean community, as a result of which the trial was delayed by one month. The jury found him guilty of second-degree murder on December 23 of that same year. Jang himself stated through an interpreter that he would prefer death rather than imprisonment; however, he was ordered to serve a 25-year sentence at San Quentin State Prison, but was released in 1919, having served only 10 years. He repatriated to Korea in 1927, where he attended the wedding of Cho Man-sik and established an orphanage in Sonchon, North Pyongan; however, under pressure from the Japanese government of Korea, he returned to the United States again. He committed suicide in San Francisco in 1930, and was buried there.

Jang was posthumously awarded the Order of Merit for National Foundation by South Korea's Ministry of Patriots' and Veterans' Affairs in 1962. In 1975, South Korean president Park Chung-hee ordered that he be reburied in the Seoul National Cemetery.

References

Further reading

1875 births
1930 suicides
Korean assassins
Korean independence activists
People from Pyongyang
Prisoners and detainees of California
Korean people imprisoned abroad
Korean expatriates in the United States
Suicides in California
Recipients of the Order of Merit for National Foundation